Southeast Colorado Regional Airport (formally known as the Lamar Municipal Airport)  is in Prowers County, Colorado, three miles southwest of Lamar, which owns it. The National Plan of Integrated Airport Systems for 2011–2015 called it a general aviation facility.

Airline flights (Central DC-3s) started about 1957; commuter airlines replaced successor Frontier in 1976-77.

Facilities
The airport covers 557 acres (225 ha) at an elevation of 3,706 feet (1,130 m). It has two runways: 18/36 is 6,304 by 100 feet (1,921 x 30 m) concrete and 8/26 is 5,001 by 60 feet (1,524 x 18 m) asphalt.

In 2010 the airport had 13,508 aircraft operations, average 37 per day: 65% general aviation, 26% air taxi, and 9% military. 33 aircraft were then based at this airport: 73% single-engine, 24% multi-engine, and 3% jet.

References

External links 
 Airport page at City of Lamar website
 Lamar Municipal Airport (LAA) at Colorado DOT Airport Directory
 Aerial image as of October 1988 from USGS The National Map
 

Airports in Colorado
Transportation buildings and structures in Prowers County, Colorado
Former Essential Air Service airports